Pseudogibbula is a genus of minute salt marsh snails with an operculum, terrestrial gastropod mollusks in the subfamily Omphalotropidinae  of the family Assimineidae.

Species
 Pseudogibbula duponti Dautzenberg, 1891

References

 Bank, R. A. (2017). Classification of the Recent freshwater/brackish Gastropoda of the World. Last update: January 24th, 2018. OpenAccess publication.

External links
 Dautzenberg, P. (1891). Mollusques recueillis au Congo par M.É. Dupont entre l'embouchure du fleuve et le confluent du Kassai. Bulletins de l'Académie Royale des Sciences, des Lettres et des Beaux-Arts de Belgique. ser. 3, 20: 566-579, pls. 1-3
 Fukuda H. & Ponder W.F. 2003. Australian freshwater assimineids, with a synopsis of the Recent genus-group taxa of the Assimineidae (Mollusca: Caenogastropoda: Rissooidea). Journal of Natural History, 37: 1977-2032.

Assimineidae